John Bensko is an American poet who taught in the MFA program at the University of Memphis, along with his wife, the fiction writer Cary Holladay.

Career 
Bensko has an MFA in creative writing from The University of Alabama (1979) and a Ph.D. in 20th-century poetry and narrative technique from Florida State University (1985). He was a student of Thomas Rabbitt in poetry and Barry Hannah in fiction, and classmate of Clark Powell: Our weekly workshops were simple - take the latest purple mimeographed worksheet of student's poems, and have everyone critique the poems. I once wrote a four-line poem that had an epigraph from Moby Dick that was almost an entire paragraph. I read the poem. Silence. Then everybody started laughing. It was that bad. Another student named John Bensko made a comment that broke everybody up: "This poem is a bit top-heavy."

Before coming to the University of Memphis, he taught at The University of Alabama, Old Dominion University, Rhodes College, and, as a Fulbright Professor in American Literature, at the University of Alicante, Spain. He has been the Coordinator of the MFA program at the University of Memphis and was Director of the River City Writers Series for the 2005–2006 season. Through the U of M Study Abroad Office, he launched a summer creative writing program at the University of Alicante, Spain.

His work has appeared in Georgia Review, Iowa Review, New England Review, New Letters, Poetry, Poetry Northwest, AGNI, Critical Quarterly, The Southern Review, The Southern Poetry Review, Shenandoah, Chelsea, OnEarth, Epoch, The Gettysburg Review, TriQuarterly, Poet Lore, The Journal, Prairie Schooner, and many other periodicals.

Personal life and family 
A former resident of Memphis along with his Virginia-born wife Cary Holladay, John Bensko was born in Birmingham, Alabama. He is the son of John Bensko, Jr, in turn the son of John (longtime mayor of Brookside, Alabama) and Julia Bensko; other relatives include uncle Robert Ray Bensko, Sr. (1936-2012) and cousins Robert Ray Bensko, Jr, Kristy Bensko, Jennifer Bensko Ha.

Awards
Yale Series of Younger Poetry Award for 1981 (selected by Richard Hugo)
 McLeod-Grobe Poetry Prize for 2000
 Anita Claire Scharf Prize for 2013

Selected works 
 The Wild Horses of Asseateague Island, Poetry, May 1983
 The Lost Watch, The Kenyon Review, Winter 2004, Volume XXVI Number 1
 Union Sniper, Poetry Southeast, Spring 2006
 Persimmon, Chelsea, Verse Daily 2006
 Blind Sight, AGNI online, August 2007
 Revenge of the Weeds: Talking with Poet John Bensko, OnEarth podcast, June 25, 2008
 Wooden Floor; Our Side of the Tracks, Prairie Schooner - Volume 82, Number 1, Spring 2008, pp. 41–43
 Dawn, Ploughshares, Winter 2006-7

Books

Anthologies

See also
American poetry

References

External links
 John Bensko, Poet of the Month, October 2005

Living people
American male poets
American poets
University of Alabama alumni
Florida State University alumni
Old Dominion University faculty
University of Memphis faculty
Rhodes College faculty
Academic staff of the University of Alicante
Year of birth missing (living people)